The Mohamoud Garad  (Full Name: ’Mohamoud Shirshore Habarwa Abdullah Muse Said Saleh Abdi Mohamed Abdirahman bin Isma'il al-Jabarti ) is a Somali clan. Its members form a part of the Dhulbahante, a sub-division of the Harti/Darod clan-family. The clan is divided into three main sub-clans ― namely the Jama Siad, the Ugaadhyahan and Omar Wa’eys.

The traditional clan chief of Mohamoud Garad is Garad Saleban Garad Mohamed.

Overview

For political purposes, the Mohamoud Garad further sub-divided into Naleya Ahmed (the numerically largest sub-clan), Jama Siad and a confederation dubbed "Galool oriye" which encompasses all other sub-clans including Nuur Ahmed, Wa’eys Abdulle, Mohamoud Ugaadhyahan and Omar Wa’eys. The Jama Siad primarily inhabit the Casuura plains in western Sool, centred around the town of Yagoori. The Naleye Ahmed occupy a very large territory of centered on the Xadeed plains, of whom the southernmost are centered around Xudun, whilst the northernmost Naleye Ahmed subclans such as Rikhaaye and Bahina Farah have their deegaans (homelands) primarily situated in Jidali as well as the surrounding hamlets of the Barrado plains. The Galool Oriye subclan of Mohamoud Garad is best known for having hosted the first and oldest head fortress of the Darawiish, i.e. the Halin fort, as well as the final Darawiish head fortress at Taleh, and they primarily settle in Xaisimo and its environs.

In the first book written on the colonial wars against the Darawiish written in 1902, Malcolm Mcneill states that the Mohamoud Garad was an enemy Darawiish clan and the one the British hated the most; it also states that British-friendly Somali clans feared the Mohamoud Garad due to them being effective raiders:

Eric Swayne was yearning to attack the Mohamoud Garad subclan of Dhulbahante on account of them being Darawiish:

However, the Mohamoud Garad was not unanimous in their support for the Dervishes and would sometimes be raided by the Dervishes because of this fact. For instance, in 1904 the Dervishes led by the Haroun attacked the Jama Siad subclan of the Mohamoud Garad. The Parliamentary Debates (official Report).: House of Commons in 1913 notes:

In 1913 at the battle of Dul Madoba the Dervishes defeated the British. The Dervish forces under the leadership of Dhulbahante military commander Ismail Mire were attacked by British expeditionary forces made up of members of the Dhulbahante clan under the command of Richard Corfield. It is reported that the Dervishes previously looted herds from the Jama Siad subclan of the Mohamoud Garad, who subsequently agreed to assist the British in their attack. Thus, 300 Jama Siad warriors along with the Somaliland Camel Corps commanded by Corfield pursued and attacked the Dervishes at Dul Madoba. The British sustained heavy casualties and Corfield was killed in battle, whilst the 300 Jama Siad warriors fled unscathed.

Subclans

Jama Siad
The first confrontation from the British colonial force was against Jama Siad clan 30 May 1901:

According to Malcolm Mcneill, these Jama Siad camels were distributed by the British to the friendly clans afterwards:

Malcolm Mcneill describes Jama Siad as the natives of the area between Oog, spelled Oak, and Saamaale, adjacent to Guumays, and taking 3,500 camels from them on account of them being "powerful" Darawiish:

People
Shire Umbaal, Jama Siad, Darawiish commander
Yusuf Agararan, Jama Siad, led most successful Darawiish raid since Dul Madoba
Adan Ali Gurey, Jama Siad, commander of Golaweyne
 Xirsi Cartan, mentioned in the Geoffrey Archer's 1916 important members of Darawiish haroun list
Serar Shawe, mentioned in the Geoffrey Archer's 1916 important members of Darawiish haroun list

Galool Oriye
 
For the link between the Galool Oriye clan and Haysimo heritage, see the Mohamoud Garad#Haysimo heritage section.

the Mohamoud Ugaadhyahan is one of elder lineages of the Mohamoud Garad and holds the traditional secondary supreme Dhulbahante Garad, currently via Garad Saleban. Garad Saleban is a direct descendant of Ali Harran, who during the mid 19th century established a sovereign and independent Dhulbahante kingdom in the northeastern half of Ciid-Nugaal. Traditionally, the two people who held the most senior position within the northern Dhulbahante Kingdom, were the Abbaan and the successors of Ali Harran. According to British explorer Cruttenden, the northeastern Dhulbahante Kingdom under Garad Ali Harran guarded the northeastern parts of Ciid-Nugaal from the Majeerteen and the northwestern parts from the Warsangeli clan as well as raiders of the Habr Je'lo clan based in Karin:

The Galool Oriye subclan of Nur Ahmed was one of the subclans which attacked a British barracks commanded by British Captain malcolm Mcneill in June 1901 wherein the British tactically prevailed over the Darawiish. The Darawiish clans encumbered 600 casualties in the attack. The other named subclans were primarily Dhulbahante subclans:

People
Cali Darmaan Garaase, was a member of the haroun (Darawiish government), of the Nur-Ahmed, a Galool Oriye Dhulbahante clan
Warsame Ciise Geeldabar, was a member of the haroun (Darawiish government), of the Nur-Ahmed, a Galool Oriye Dhulbahante clan
Ali Meggar, Darawiish naval commander

Naleye Ahmed
The Naleye Ahmed, boasts the largest sub-lineage within the Ugaadhyahan and the Mohamoud Garad clan. According to Markus Virgil Hoehne, a conflict anthropologist at the University of Leipzig stated during his trip to Northern Somalia: "Naaleeye Axmed is probably the largest sub-clan of the Dhulbahante. Its members live in areas stretching from Adhicadeeye west of Laascaanood, up to Ceerigaabo in Sanaag region."

In Sool, The subclan resides primarily in the Hudun district, Taleh district, and Lasanod district. In Sanaag, the Naleya Ahmed are the sole Dhulbahante subclan that resides in the region, with the Erigavo District being their native settlement historically.
John A Hunt stated the following about the location of the Naleye Ahmed territory:

 "The Nogal (Las Anod) District defined in 1944. This was supposed to have been done for administrative convenience, but the somewhat crooked boundary between the Burao and Nogal districts suggests that it was intended to make the Las Anod-Nogal District an entirely Dolbahanta Tribal District ... All the Dolbahanta have been Las Anod District since 1944, except for the Naleya Ahmed of the Ogadyahan Siad ... remaining in Erigavo District".

During the 2000s decade, some Somali regional administrations advocated carving out a distinct district for the Bahina Farah, Bah Rikhaaye and Bah-Idoor subclans of Naleye Ahmed called Fiqifuliye District; the Bah-idoor Naleye Ahmed is not to be confused with the Warsangeli subclan who settle in the town of Hingalool whom are also called Bah-idoor. During the colonial era, the Naleye Ahmed subclan of Dhulbahante was known for coercing neighbouring clans to hold diplomatic relations with the Darawiish. For example, the Habar Yunis clan of Musa Ismail was coerced by Naleye Ahmed Dhulbahante to have diplomatic relations with Darawiish due to their imminent southward migration as a result of abundant rain in the Nugal valley:

The Jibril Naleya and Ali Naleya subclans of Naleya Ahmed were singled out by the British colonialist government in Berbera as requiring a heavy penalty for their adherence to Darawiishnimo:

People
Afqarshe Ismail, Adan Naleye, former Darawiish spokesman-poet; and first person to die in an airstrike in Africa
Nur Hedik, Ali Naleye, commander of the Darawiish cavalry who had a shiikhyaale regiment named after him
 Ibrahim Galongol, Jibril Naleye mentioned in the Geoffrey Archer's 1916 important members of Darawiish haroun list
 Warsame Ali Gulaydh, mentioned in the Geoffrey Archer's 1916 important members of Darawiish haroun list

Groups
Indhabadan, was a Darawiish administrative division which was half Mohamoud Garaad, specifically, Naleeye Ahmed.
Ba Ina Nur Hedik, the entire Mohamoud Garad populated the Shiikhyaale administrative division, however, the Naleye Ahmed were in its aforementioned branch

Distribution
The traditional homeland of the Mohamoud Garad straddles the Nugaal Valley, while they primarily settle in the regions of Sool, Sanaag and Togdheer in Somaliland. In particular, members of the clan are well represented in the districts of Las Anod, Xudun, Taleh, Erigavo and Buuhoodle.

Moreover, the clan has a significant presence in the Somali cities of Las Anod, Erigavo, Garowe and Kismayo.

Haysimo heritage
The regions inhabited by the Galool Oriye subclan primarily consists of the northeasternmost parts of Sool, commonly referred to as the Haysimo region. This is due to the fact that the Galool Oriye clan hosted the earliest Darawiish central fort, the Halin Fort, as well as the final, in Taleh, namely Silsilad. As such the Galool Oriye clan are considered the custodians of the Darawiish central forts, named as Dhulbahante garesas by the Italian governor Caroselli, namely Halin fort and Taleh fort.

Halin Fort
The notion of the building of fortresses for Darawiish began as soon as hostilities came to light in 1899; as Eric Swayne encountered a fort at Halin during the second expedition in 1902, The British War Office stated that Eric Swayne destroyed the fort in 1902, and that it was inhabited by the Ugaadhyahan Dhulbahante subclans of Naleye Ahmed and Nur Ahmed:

These Darawiish inhabited forts were referred to by the Sayid and Italian governor Caroselli as Dhulbahante garesas taken from the Dhulbahante clan by the British:

Although the endonymic term for Darawiish built installations as per the Sayid and Caroselli are Dhulbahante garesas, colonial sources refer to them as Dervish forts.

Silsilad
Silsilad was the man building of the Silsilad complex built by Darawiish:

Transit Dhulbahante garesas

Transit Dhulbahante garesas were forts that were meant for conveyance to larger Dhulbahante garesa and were typically smaller. The main transit Dhulbahante garesa to the east was the Yabaayil Dhulbahante garesa, a transit site for travel to the Eyl Dhulbahante garesa. The main northern transit Dhulbahante garesa was the Hiilburaan Dhulbahante garesa, situated in the town of the same name.

Hiilbuuraan incident
The main northern transit Dhulbahante garesa was the Hiilburaan Dhulbahante garesa, situated in the town of the same name. The most notable incident in one of these transit Dhulbahante garesas was the Habar Humbulle incident which pitted the Dervishes against the Majeerteen Sultanate. According to the British Sudan Archives, in the battle between the Dervishes and the Majeerteen Sultanate, Shire Umbaal, spelled as Shira Um Belli, headed the bellicosity against the Italian protectorate known as Majeerteen. 

Although the Dervishes were victorious over the Majeerteen, the Habar Humbulle event was described as a pyrrhic victory for the Darawiish:

The enemies of Darawiish also engaged in counter-propaganda. The most important of these was the 1910 where they succeeded in instigating a Darawiish civil war. Shire Umbaal led the backlash against mutiny. According to a 1910 intelligence report from the British Aden colony documenting a battle between Darawiish and native auxiliaries of the Italians, Shire Umbaal, spelled in the report as Shire Ambaleh, was described as among the top three highest ranked Darawiish commanders, alongside Nur Hedik and Adam Maleh. The report states that he died in 1910:

Shire Umbaal was in 1910 described at the Parliament of the United Kingdom, specifically by Robert Crewe-Milnes, 1st Marquess of Crewe as "a very important leader of the Dervishes".

A native Somali sources states that Shire Umbaal was employed as a leader and organizer of a British orchestrated coup d'état, but that Shire Umbaal subsequently turned on the British colonialists and their native conspirators:

Umbaal was a Darawiish whi=stleblower who reported an attempted political overthrow that was attempted upon the leadership of the Somali Darawiish at the end of the 1900s decade.Qaran iyo Qabiil: Laba aan is qaban , PAGE 134, Cabdillaahi, Rashiid

Noted Somali author Said Samatar in his book Oral Poetry and Somali Nationalism also described the Shire Umbaal incident in his book. Sources overall deliberate on the tumultuous nature of the incident of Shire Umbaal's whistleblowing, with the author Abdisalam Issa-Salwe describing it as having precipitated a Somali civil war:

Among the three motions put forward by Shire Umbaal and others was (a) to kill the Sayid and replace him with another person, (b) to merely demote the Sayid of all his positions without killing him, (c) to completely dismantle the Darawiish anti-colonial struggle. After a lengthy debate, the third choice was chosen, however Shire Umbaal subsequently turned against the Darawiish defectors and conspirators:

The dialogue between the Sayid and Umbaal was as follows, with Umbaal saying the following to the Sayid:

Shire Umbaal's counter-dereliction to the defection from Taleh that took place in 1909 in the 'Iid and Nugaal region had the effect of extending the longest anti-colonial resistance movement during the Scramble for Africa. Douglas Jardine described the event as follows:

Landmarks

There are many landmarks that ideate the Darawiish, including monuments in Jigjiga and Mogadishu of the Sayid, an airport in Kismaayo, and the Buuhoodle airport which was named after Ismail Mire as Gegada diyaaradaha Ismaciil Mire. Buuhoodle's Ismail Mire airport is the first Somali airport named after a Darawiish figure. Sacmadeeqa is a landmark in Somali Region which has a monument that identifies the birthplace of Sayid Mohamed. It is located in the Haud region, near the lake of Qoob Fardood. It was created as a form of remembrance of the anti-colonial struggle. They said that the most frequent visitors to the monument are the Arale Mahad and Ali Gheri, due to the fact that they were the most persistent dervishes. Dareemacaddo  was the site of the creation of the Dervish movement of Las Anod#Diiriye Guure Diiriye Guure.  via the practise of Tawassul, and the area itself is one of two deegaans (homelands) of the Arale Mahad clan, alongside Dhilaalo.Xasuus Qor, Faarax M. Maxamed

Extremities
The northernmost Dhulbahante garesas were situated in the Surudu Hills and barrado plains in Cal reachable via the Hiilbuuraan transit Dhulbahante garesa. The easternmost Dhulbahante garesa was situated at Eyl, reachable via the Yabaayil transit Dhulbahante garesa. The southernmost Dhulbahante garesa was the Qollad Dhulbahante garesa reachable via the Docmo transit Dhulbahante garesa.

Clan tree

"There is no clear agreement on the clan and sub-clan structures and some lineages might be omitted." However, the following summarized clan tree presented below is taken from John Hunt's A general survey of the Somaliland Protectorate (1944-1950):

Abdirahman bin Isma'il al-Jabarti (Darod)
 Mohamed Abdirahman (Kabalalah)
 Abdi Mohamed (Kombe)
Salah Abdi (Harti)
Said Abdi (Dhulbahante')
Muse Said
Abdale Muse
Habarwa Abdale
Shirshore Habarwa
Mohamoud 'Garad' Shirshore
Wa'eys Mohamoud (Omar Wa'eys)
Gulled Omar (Bah Barkad)
Yassin Omar
Sharmarke Yassin
Geedi Yassin
Ismail Geedi
Gulled Ismail (Bah Hayaag)
Wa'eys Ismail (Bah Hayaag)
Rage Ismail
Osman Ismail
Hersi Ismail
 Adan Ismail
Abdulle Geedi
Adan Abdulle
Mohamed Abdulle
Fiqi Abdulle
Siad Mohamoud
Jama Siad 
Samakab Jama
Mohamed Samakab
Adan Samakab
Osman Samakab
Fahiye Osman
Liban Osman
Ahmed Jama
Mohamoud Jama
Warfa Jama
Naleya Warfa (Bah Jibrahil)
Farah Warfa
Diriye Farah
Afi Farah
Nur Farah
Naleya Farah (Bah Hayaag)
Mohamed Farah (Bah Hayaag)
Kooshin "Reer Kooshin" Farah (Bah Hayaag)
Awad Kooshin
Ali Kooshin
Omar Kooshin
Khayr "Reer Khayr" Farah (Bah Hayaag)
Jama Khayr
Da'ar khayr
Egal Khayr
Fahiye Khayr
Mohamed Khayr
Ali Farah
Rageh Ali
Hussein Ali
Mohamed Ali
Orshe Ali
Mohamud Ali
Mohamed Mohamoud
Ali Mohamed
Adad Mohamed
Fiqi-xasan Mohamed
Essa Mohamed
Abdillahi Mohamed
Aw-Abdi Mohamed
Ali Mohamoud
Hersi Ali
Adan Ali
Guled Ali
Shirdon Ali
Mohamoud Ali
Farah Ali
Kulan Ali
Fahiye Ali
Wa'eys Ali
Warsame Ali
Hussein Warsama
Diriye Warsama
Hassan Warsama
Gulled Warsama
Mohamed Warsama
Musa Mohamed
Liban Mohamed
Hussein Mohamed
Hassan Mohamed
Abdi Mohamed
Omar Mohamed
Aralleh Mohamed
Ali Mohamed
Elmi Mohamed
Ahmed Mohamed
Abdi (Adde) Mohamed
Ciye Mohamed
Farah Dheir Mohamed
Fahiya Farah
Mohamoud Farah
Samakab Farah
Rageh Farah
Gulled Farah
Hussein Farah
Abdi farah
Ali Farah
Hir Farah
Mohamed Siad (Ugadhyahan)
Adan Mohamed
Mohamoud Mohamed (Galool Oriye)
Hassan Mohamoud
Mohamoud 'Gaboobe' Mohamoud
Abdi Mohamoud
Samakab Mohamed
Abdulle Samakab
Wa’eys Abdulle (Galool Oriye)
Abokor Abdulle
Ahmed Abdulle
Shirwa Ahmed (Galool Oriye)
Osman Ahmed (Galool Oriye)
Nur Ahmed (Galool Oriye)
Seed Nur
Samatar Nur
Yusuf Nur
Musa Nur
Samakab Nur (Bihina Ali)
Ismail Nur (Bihina Ali)
Hersi Nur
Mohamed Nur
Ali Nur
Ahmed Ali
Yusuf Ali
Wa'eys Ali
Adan Ali
Samakab Ali
Farah Ali
Naleya Ahmed
Ismail Naleya (Bah Idoor)
Mohamed Naleya (Bah Idoor)
Farah Naleya (Bah Idoor)
Ahmed Naleya (Bah Idoor) 
Adan Naleya (Bah Idoor)
Samood Naleya (Bah ina Farah)
Shirwa Naleya (Bah ina Farah)
Liban Naleya (Bah ina Farah)
Yusuf Naleya (Bah ina Farah)
Abdulle Naleya (Bah Fiqishini)
Elmi Naleya (Bah Fiqishini)
Ali Elmi (Bah Habr Je'lo)
Ahmed Elmi (Bah Habar Je'lo)
Adan Elmi (Bah Habar Je'lo)
Mohamed Elmi (Bah Warsangeli)
Igal Elmi (Bah Warsangeli)
Jibril Naleya (Bah Fiqishini)
Fahiye Jibril (Bih Idoor)
Ahmed Jibril (Bih Idoor)
Hadiyo Jibril (Bah Hayaag)
Samakab Jibril (Bah Hayaag)
 Ali Naleya (Bah Fiqishini)
Farah Ali (Bah Rikhaaye)
Mohamed Ali (Bah Rikhaaye)
Samatar Ali (Bah Rikhaaye)
Igal Ali (Bah ina Araale)
Abdi Ali (Bah ina Araale)
Fahiye Ali (Bah ina Araale)
Ahmed Ali (Bah ina Araale)
Hussein Ali (Bah Ina Samatar)
Yaqub Ali (Bah Ina Samatar)
Yusuf Ali (Bah Abdulle)
Elmi Ali (Bah Abdulle)
Omar Ali (Bihi Idarays)
Mohamoud Ali (Bihi Idarays)
Wa'eys Ali (Bihi Idarays)

Notable Figures

Enterprisers
Hodan Nalayeh, Somali-Canadian journalist. 
Amina Mohamed, former Chairman of the INM and the WTO's General Council, and the current Secretary for Foreign Affairs of Kenya.

Presidents
Abdisamad Ali Shire, former Puntland vice-president. 
Ahmed Elmi Osman, Vice President of Puntland.

Royalty
Garad Saleban Garad Mohamed, current supreme garaad of Maxamuud Garaad
Adan Ali Gurey, Darawiish monarch and commander of Golaweyne

Politicians
Yasin Haji Mohamoud, former Foreign Minister of Somaliland. 
Faisal Hassan, Canadian politician.

Commanders
Shire Umbaal, Jama Siad, Darawiish commander
Ismail Mire, Ali Geri, head of the central Darawiish military, and leader of most successful Darawiish victories in the defeat of Richard Corfield and the colonial forces in the raid of Dul Madoba

Athletes
Abdi Bile, Somalia's most decorated athlete with the most Somali national records. 
Mohamed Suleiman, first ethnic Somali to win an Olympic medal.

Security
Abdi Hassan Mohamed (Hijaar), former Somali Police Force Commissioner.
Mohamed Adam Ahmed, former Chief of Staff of the Somali Armed Forces.

Notes

References

Dhulbahante
Somali clans in Ethiopia